Kienle Cirque is an ice-filled cirque,  wide, the largest cirque on the west side of White Island, in the Ross Archipelago, Antarctica. It was named by the Advisory Committee on Antarctic Names (1999) after Juergen Kienle of the Geophysical Institute, University of Alaska Fairbanks, a team leader for the investigation of volcanic activity and seismicity at nearby Mount Erebus in six seasons, 1980–81 through 1985–86.

References

Cirques of Antarctica
Landforms of the Ross Dependency
White Island (Ross Archipelago)